The Govetts Leap Falls, also called the Bridal Veil Falls or simply Govetts Leap, is a bridal veil waterfall on the Govetts Leap Brook where it falls over Taylor Wall, located at Govetts Leap Lookout, approximately  east of  in the Blue Mountains region of New South Wales, Australia.

The archaeologist, V. Gordon Childe killed himself at the falls in 1957.

Location and features
Govetts Leap Falls is situated overlooking the Grose Valley in the Blue Mountains National Park.

At the nearby Govetts Leap Lookout there are public toilets, picnic tables and access to water.

See also 

List of waterfalls in New South Wales

References 

Waterfalls of the Blue Mountains